Group Therapy is the third studio album by American nu metal band Dope. The enhanced portion of the album contains a music video for each song. Group Therapy shows the band expanding on the more alternative metal style music the band had started on their previous album, Life, and most of the industrial style music has been toned down. The album contains some of the band's most heavy and aggressive songs while certain songs such as "Sing", "Another Day Goes By" and "Easier" show a softer, more melodic sound. In the second half of 2004 the album had already sold about 37,749 in United States. "Now is the Time" was used in an episode of Dog the Bounty Hunter.

Critical reception

Group Therapy garnered mixed reviews from music critics. Magnus Altkula of Sputnikmusic praised the album's production quality and instrumentation work for being improvements over previous records with Dope's inspirational lyricism, saying that "[T]he band has matured a lot but still have room to grow and I hope that one day they land a real masterpiece." Kaj Roth of Melodic commended the band's industrial direction with newfound musicianship but felt that it lacked memorable tracks that other bands like Orgy and Godhead had, calling it "An okay record, no more!" Johnny Loftus of AllMusic found the album better than 2001's Life but felt that Edsel Dope's take on the nu-metal formula was too reminiscent of Korn and Linkin Park with insincere introspection, concluding that "Dope has focused its fiery attack on Group Therapy, and that should at least get the pit roiling at shows. But Edsel's agenda is still riddled with cliché, and this fact robs the record of any lasting spark."

Track listing

Personnel
Credits adapted from AllMusic.
Dope
 Edsel Dope – lead vocals, backing vocals, rhythm guitar, bass, drums, keyboards, programming, sampling
 Virus – lead guitar, keyboards, backing vocals
 Sloane "Mosey" Jentry – bass, backing vocals
 Racci "Sketchy" Shay – drums

Additional personnel
 Heather Thompson – backing vocals

Production
 Edsel Dope – production, A&R, arrangements, art conception, audio engineering, audio production, composition, direction, engineering
 Stephen Franciosa – editing
 Mike Graham – photography
 Ted Jensen – mastering
 Jay Baumgardner – mixing
 Joe Morena – editing
 Shawn Nowotnik – assistant
 Chip Quigley – A&R
 Daniel Wyatt – A&R

Charts

References

2003 albums
Dope (band) albums
Artemis Records albums